Saint Gabhran was a 5th-century Irish saint.

Biography

Gabhran was an Irish Christian saint who lived about 460 AD.  His father was Dubhthach moccu Lughair, the Chief Ollam of Ireland.  Gabhran's brothers were all saints and founders of churches, mainly in Leinster.  They included Fachtna of Kiltoom, Trian, Saint Euhel, Moninne, Lonan and Saint Molaisse Mac Lugair.

The Martyrology of Donegal gives Gabhran's feast-day as 14 November as follows- “The three sons of Dubhthach, i.e., Fachtna of Cill-Toma, Gabhran and Euhel, the other two.”

The Martyrology of Gorman (Félire Uí Gormáin), for the same day gives- “Dear are the pure-formed, three godly sons of Dubthach”.

References

 Loca Patriciana. No. V. The Druids, Dubhtach Mac Ui Lugair and His Sons, Rev John Francis Shearman - The Journal of the Royal Historical and Archaeological Association of Ireland, 1874.
 'The Martyrology of Donegal' ed. John O'Donovan, 1864.
 'The Martyrology of Gorman' ed. Whitley Stokes, 1895.
Pádraig Ó Riain, Corpus genealogiarum sanctorum Hiberniae. Dublin, 1985, Section 670.72

5th-century Christian saints
5th-century Irish people
Medieval Irish saints